Veronica albicans, synonym Hebe albicans, is a species of flowering plant in the family Plantaginaceae, native to New Zealand.

Description
The small white flowers, on flowerheads  in length, appear from December to April. The Latin specific epithet albicans means "off-white", referring to the colour of the flowers.

Distribution and habitat
A closely related species, Veronica amplexicaulis, is found in a similar habitat in Canterbury.

This plant has gained the Royal Horticultural Society's Award of Garden Merit.

References

albicans
Flora of New Zealand
Plants described in 1916